Solport is a civil parish in City of Carlisle district, Cumbria, England. In the 2011 UK Census it had a population of 166.

It shares a parish council with the adjacent parish of Stapleton.

Etymology
The name Solport is Brittonic in origin and derived from *sulu, probably meaning "a view" or "prospect" (Welsh syllu, Breton selle), suffixed with -pert, "bush, thicket" (Welsh perth).

Listed buildings

There are two listed buildings in the parish, both at grade II: a house with barn, and a former Quaker meeting house.

References

External links

 Cumbria County History Trust: Solport (nb: provisional research only – see Talk page)
 Cumbria County History Trust: Trough (nb: provisional research only – see Talk page)

Civil parishes in Cumbria
City of Carlisle